The power spectrum  of a time series  describes the distribution of power into frequency components composing that signal.  According to Fourier analysis, any physical signal can be decomposed into a number of discrete frequencies, or a spectrum of frequencies over a continuous range. The statistical average of a certain signal or sort of signal (including noise) as analyzed in terms of its frequency content, is called its spectrum.

When the energy of the signal is concentrated around a finite time interval, especially if its total energy is finite, one may compute the energy spectral density. More commonly used is the power spectral density (or simply power spectrum), which applies to signals existing over all time, or over a time period large enough (especially in relation to the duration of a measurement) that it could as well have been over an infinite time interval. The power spectral density (PSD) then refers to the spectral energy distribution that would be found per unit time, since the total energy of such a signal over all time would generally be infinite. Summation or integration of the spectral components yields the total power (for a physical process) or variance (in a statistical process), identical to what would be obtained by integrating  over the time domain, as dictated by Parseval's theorem.

For instance, the pitch and timbre of a musical instrument are immediately determined from a spectral analysis. The color of a light source is determined by the spectrum of the electromagnetic wave's electric field  as it fluctuates at an extremely high frequency. Obtaining a spectrum from time series such as these involves the Fourier transform, and generalizations based on Fourier analysis. In many cases the time domain is not specifically employed in practice, such as when a dispersive prism is used to obtain a spectrum of light in a spectrograph, or when a sound is perceived through its effect on the auditory receptors of the inner ear, each of which is sensitive to a particular frequency.
 
However this article concentrates on situations in which the time series is known (at least in a statistical sense) or directly measured (such as by a microphone sampled by a computer). The power spectrum is important in statistical signal processing and in the statistical study of stochastic processes, as well as in many other branches of physics and engineering. Typically the process is a function of time, but one can similarly discuss data in the spatial domain being decomposed in terms of spatial frequency.

Units 

In physics, the signal might be a wave, such as an electromagnetic wave, an acoustic wave, or the vibration of a mechanism. The power spectral density (PSD) of the signal describes the power present in the signal as a function of frequency, per unit frequency. Power spectral density is commonly expressed in watts per hertz (W/Hz).

When a signal is defined in terms only of a voltage, for instance, there is no unique power associated with the stated amplitude. In this case "power" is simply reckoned in terms of the square of the signal, as this would always be proportional to the actual power delivered by that signal into a given impedance. So one might use units of V2 Hz−1 for the PSD. Energy spectral density (ESD) would have units would be  V2 s Hz−1, since energy has units of power multiplied by time (e.g., watt-hour).

In the general case, the units of PSD will be the ratio of units of variance per unit of frequency; so, for example, a series of displacement values (in meters) over time (in seconds) will have PSD in units of meters squared per hertz, m2/Hz.
In the analysis of random vibrations, units of g2 Hz−1 are frequently used for the PSD of acceleration, where g denotes the g-force.

Mathematically, it is not necessary to assign physical dimensions to the signal or to the independent variable. In the following discussion the meaning of x(t) will remain unspecified, but the independent variable will be assumed to be that of time.

Definition

Energy spectral density 

Energy spectral density describes how the energy of a signal or a time series is distributed with frequency. Here, the term energy is used in the generalized sense of signal processing; that is, the energy  of a signal  is:

The energy spectral density is most suitable for transients—that is, pulse-like signals—having a finite total energy. Finite or not, Parseval's theorem (or Plancherel's theorem) gives us an alternate expression for the energy of the signal:

where:

The theorem also holds true in the discrete-time cases. Since the integral on the right-hand side is the energy of the signal, the value of can be interpreted as a density function multiplied by an infinitesimally small frequency interval, describing the energy contained in the signal at frequency  in the frequency interval . 

The function  and the autocorrelation of  form a Fourier transform pair, a result also known as the Wiener–Khinchin theorem (see also Periodogram).

As a physical example of how one might measure the energy spectral density of a signal, suppose  represents the potential (in volts) of an electrical pulse propagating along a transmission line of impedance , and suppose the line is terminated with a matched resistor (so that all of the pulse energy is delivered to the resistor and none is reflected back). To find the value of the energy spectral density  at frequency , one could insert between the transmission line and the resistor a bandpass filter which passes only a narrow range of frequencies (say) near the frequency of interest and then measure the total energy  dissipated across the resistor. In this example, since the power  has units of V2 Ω−1, the energy  has units of V2 s Ω−1 = J, and hence the estimate  of the energy spectral density has units of J Hz−1, as required. In many situations, it is common to forget the step of dividing by  so that the energy spectral density instead has units of V2 Hz−2.

This definition generalizes in a straightforward manner to a discrete signal with a countably infinite number of values  such as a signal sampled at discrete times :

where  is the discrete-time Fourier transform of   The sampling interval  is needed to keep the correct physical units and to ensure that we recover the continuous case in the limit   But in the mathematical sciences the interval is often set to 1, which simplifies the results at the expense of generality. (also see normalized frequency)

Power spectral density 

The above definition of energy spectral density is suitable for transients (pulse-like signals) whose energy is concentrated around one time window; then the Fourier transforms of the signals generally exist. For continuous signals over all time, one must rather define the power spectral density (PSD) which exists for stationary processes; this describes how the power of a signal or time series is distributed over frequency, as in the simple example given previously.  Here, power can be the actual physical power, or more often, for convenience with abstract signals, is simply identified with the squared value of the signal. For example, statisticians study the variance of a function over time  (or over another independent variable), and using an analogy with electrical signals (among other physical processes), it is customary to refer to it as the power spectrum even when there is no physical power involved. If one were to create a physical voltage source which followed  and applied it to the terminals of a one ohm resistor, then indeed the instantaneous power dissipated in that resistor would be given by   watts.

The average power  of a signal  over all time is therefore given by the following time average, where the period  is centered about some arbitrary time :

However, for the sake of dealing with the math that follows, it is more convenient to deal with time limits in the signal itself rather than time limits in the bounds of the integral.

Clearly in cases where the above expression for P is non-zero (even as T grows without bound) the integral itself must also grow without bound. That is the reason that we cannot use the energy spectral density itself, which is that diverging integral, in such cases.

In analyzing the frequency content of the signal , one might like to compute the ordinary Fourier transform ; however, for many signals of interest the Fourier transform does not formally exist. Regardless, Parseval's theorem tells us that we can re-write the average power as follows.

Then the power spectral density is simply defined as the integrand above.

Many authors use this equality to actually define the power spectral density.

The power of the signal in a given frequency band , where , can be calculated by integrating over frequency. Since , an equal amount of power can be attributed to positive and negative frequency bands, which accounts for the factor of 2 in the following form (such trivial factors depend on the conventions used):

More generally, similar techniques may be used to estimate a time-varying spectral density. In this case the time interval  is finite rather than approaching infinity. Just using a single such time series, the estimated power spectrum will be very "noisy"; however this can be alleviated if it is possible to evaluate the expected value (in the above equation) using a large (or infinite) number of short-term spectra corresponding to statistical ensembles of realizations of  evaluated over the specified time window.

Just as with the energy spectral density, the definition of the power spectral density can be generalized to discrete time variables .

Note that a single estimate of the PSD can be obtained through a finite number of samplings.  As before, the actual PSD is achieved when  (and thus ) approaches infinity and the expected value is formally applied. In a real-world application, one would typically average a finite-measurement PSD over many trials to obtain a more accurate estimate of the theoretical PSD of the physical process underlying the individual measurements.  This computed PSD is sometimes called a periodogram. This periodogram converges to the true PSD as the number of estimates as well as the averaging time interval  approach infinity (Brown & Hwang).

If two signals both possess power spectral densities, then the cross-spectral density can similarly be calculated; as the PSD is related to the autocorrelation, so is the cross-spectral density related to the cross-correlation.

Properties of the power spectral density 

Some properties of the PSD include:

Cross power spectral density  

To begin, let us consider the average power of such a combined signal.

Using the same notation and methods as used for the power spectral density derivation, we exploit Parseval's theorem and obtain

Note that , so the full contribution to the cross power is, generally, from twice the real part of either individual CPSD. Just as before, from here we recast these products as the Fourier transform of a time convolution, which when divided by the period and taken to the limit  becomes the Fourier transform of a cross-correlation function.

Therefore, in typical signal processing, the full CPSD is just one of the CPSDs scaled by a factor of two.

For discrete signals xn and yn, the relationship between the cross-spectral density and the cross-covariance is

Estimation 

The goal of spectral density estimation is to estimate the spectral density of a random signal from a sequence of time samples. Depending on what is known about the signal, estimation techniques can involve parametric or non-parametric approaches, and may be based on time-domain or frequency-domain analysis. For example, a common parametric technique involves fitting the observations to an autoregressive model. A common non-parametric technique is the periodogram.

The spectral density is usually estimated using Fourier transform methods (such as the Welch method), but other techniques such as the maximum entropy method can also be used.

Related concepts 

 The spectral centroid of a signal is the midpoint of its spectral density function, i.e. the frequency that divides the distribution into two equal parts.
  The spectral edge frequency (SEF), usually expressed as "SEF x", represents the frequency below which x percent of the total power of a given signal are located; typically, x is in the range 75 to 95. It is more particularly a popular measure used in EEG monitoring, in which case SEF has variously been used to estimate the depth of anesthesia and stages of sleep.
  A spectral envelope is the envelope curve of the spectrum density. It describes one point in time (one window, to be precise). For example, in remote sensing using a spectrometer, the spectral envelope of a feature is the boundary of its spectral properties, as defined by the range of brightness levels in each of the spectral bands of interest.
 The spectral density is a function of frequency, not a function of time. However, the spectral density of a small window of a longer signal may be calculated, and plotted versus time associated with the window. Such a graph is called a spectrogram. This is the basis of a number of spectral analysis techniques such as the short-time Fourier transform and wavelets.
  A "spectrum" generally means the power spectral density, as discussed above, which depicts the distribution of signal content over frequency. For transfer functions (e.g., Bode plot, chirp) the complete frequency response may be graphed in two parts: power versus frequency and phase versus frequency—the phase spectral density, phase spectrum, or spectral phase. Less commonly, the two parts may be the real and imaginary parts of the transfer function. This is not to be confused with the frequency response of a transfer function, which also includes a phase (or equivalently, a real and imaginary part) as a function of frequency. The time-domain impulse response  cannot generally be uniquely recovered from the power spectral density alone without the phase part. Although these are also Fourier transform pairs, there is no symmetry (as there is for the autocorrelation) forcing the Fourier transform to be real-valued. See Ultrashort pulse#Spectral phase, phase noise, group delay.
  Sometimes one encounters an amplitude spectral density (ASD), which is the square root of the PSD; the ASD of a voltage signal has units of V Hz−1/2. This is useful when the shape of the spectrum is rather constant, since variations in the ASD will then be proportional to variations in the signal's voltage level itself. But it is mathematically preferred to use the PSD, since only in that case is the area under the curve meaningful in terms of actual power over all frequency or over a specified bandwidth.

Applications 

Any signal that can be represented as a variable that varies in time has a corresponding frequency spectrum. This includes familiar entities such as visible light (perceived as color), musical notes (perceived as pitch), radio/TV (specified by their frequency, or sometimes wavelength) and even the regular rotation of the earth. When these signals are viewed in the form of a frequency spectrum, certain aspects of the received signals or the underlying processes producing them are revealed. In some cases the frequency spectrum may include a distinct peak corresponding to a sine wave component. And additionally there may be peaks corresponding to harmonics of a fundamental peak, indicating a periodic signal which is not simply sinusoidal. Or a continuous spectrum may show narrow frequency intervals which are strongly enhanced corresponding to resonances, or frequency intervals containing almost zero power as would be produced by a notch filter.

Electrical engineering 

The concept and use of the power spectrum of a signal is fundamental in electrical engineering, especially in electronic communication systems, including radio communications, radars, and related systems, plus passive remote sensing technology. Electronic instruments called spectrum analyzers are used to observe and measure the power spectra of signals.

The spectrum analyzer measures the magnitude of the short-time Fourier transform (STFT) of an input signal. If the signal being analyzed can be considered a stationary process, the STFT is a good smoothed estimate of its power spectral density.

Cosmology 
Primordial fluctuations, density variations in the early universe, are quantified by a power spectrum which gives the power of the variations as a function of spatial scale.

Climate Science 
Power spectral-analysis have been used to examine the spatial structures for climate research. These results suggests atmospheric turbulence link climate change to more local regional volatility in weather conditions.

See also 
 Bispectrum
 Brightness temperature
 Colors of noise
 Least-squares spectral analysis
 Noise spectral density
 Spectral density estimation
 Spectral efficiency
 Spectral leakage
 Spectral power distribution
 Whittle likelihood
 Window function

Notes

References

External links 
 Power Spectral Density Matlab scripts

Frequency-domain analysis
Signal processing
Waves
Spectroscopy
Scattering
Fourier analysis
Radio spectrum